Newsbeat was the flagship news broadcast of Net 25 (DZEC-TV) in the Philippines. The show premiered on October 11, 2004 replacing World Report Filipino Edition. It was currently anchored by Ivy Canlas and Joy Maico, and has the slogan "Ang bagong pulso ng mga balita" ("The new pulse of the news").  A 60-minute newscast, was aired at 6:00 PM Philippine time.

Veteran broadcaster Ka Totoy Talastas joins the duo in providing commentary on the day's current affairs.

The show ended on August 10, 2007, and was replaced by I-Balita.

See also
List of programs previously broadcast by Net 25

2004 Philippine television series debuts
2007 Philippine television series endings
Filipino-language television shows
Flagship evening news shows
Net 25 original programming
Philippine television news shows